The 2021 Swiss Open (officially known as the Yonex Swiss Open 2021, after its sponsor) was a badminton tournament in St. Jakobshalle in Basel, Switzerland, from 2 to 7 March 2021. It had a purse of $140,000.

Tournament 
The 2021 Swiss Open was the first tournament of the 2021 BWF World Tour and also part of the Swiss Open championships which had been held since 1955. This tournament was organized by the Swiss Badminton and sanctioned by the BWF.

Venue 
This international tournament was held at St. Jakobshalle in Basel, Switzerland.

Point distribution 
Below is the point distribution table for each phase of the tournament based on the BWF points system for the BWF World Tour Super 300 event.

Prize money 
The total prize money for this tournament was US$140,000. Distribution of prize money was in accordance with BWF regulations.

Men's singles

Seeds 

 Viktor Axelsen (champion)
 Lee Zii Jia (semi-finals)
 Rasmus Gemke (second round)
 Srikanth Kidambi (semi-finals)
 B. Sai Praneeth (quarter-finals)
 Kantaphon Wangcharoen (quarter-finals)
 Shesar Hiren Rhustavito (quarter-finals)
 Kunlavut Vitidsarn (final)

Wild card 
Swiss Badminton awarded a wild card entry to Christian Kirchmayr of Switzerland.

Finals

Top half

Section 1

Section 2

Bottom half

Section 3

Section 4

Women's singles

Seeds 

 Carolina Marín (champion)
 P. V. Sindhu (final)
 Pornpawee Chochuwong (semi-finals)
 Mia Blichfeldt (semi-finals)
 Busanan Ongbamrungphan (quarter-finals)
 Sung Ji-hyun (second round)
 Zhang Beiwen (quarter-finals)
 Kim Ga-eun (first round)

Finals

Top half

Section 1

Section 2

Bottom half

Section 3

Section 4

Men's doubles

Seeds 

 Aaron Chia / Soh Wooi Yik (semi-finals)
 Satwiksairaj Rankireddy / Chirag Shetty (semi-finals)
 Goh V Shem / Tan Wee Kiong (second round)
 Marcus Ellis / Chris Langridge (second round)
 Ong Yew Sin / Teo Ee Yi (quarter-finals)
 Kim Astrup / Anders Skaarup Rasmussen (champions)
 Vladimir Ivanov / Ivan Sozonov (second round)
 Ben Lane / Sean Vendy (second round)

Wild card 
Swiss Badminton awarded a wildcard entry to Yann Orteu / Minh Quang Pham of Switzerland.

Finals

Top half

Section 1

Section 2

Bottom half

Section 3

Section 4

Women's doubles

Seeds 

 Jongkolphan Kititharakul / Rawinda Prajongjai (semi-finals)
 Chow Mei Kuan / Lee Meng Yean (semi-finals)
 Gabriela Stoeva / Stefani Stoeva (final)
 Chloe Birch / Lauren Smith (first round)
 Maiken Fruergaard / Sara Thygesen (quarter-finals)
 Émilie Lefel / Anne Tran (first round)
 Rachel Honderich / Kristen Tsai (quarter-finals)
 Selena Piek / Cheryl Seinen (quarter-finals)

Wild card 
Swiss Badminton awarded a wildcard entry to Jenjira Stadelmann / Caroline Racloz of Switzerland.

Finals

Top half

Section 1

Section 2

Bottom half

Section 3

Section 4

Mixed doubles

Seeds 

 Chan Peng Soon / Goh Liu Ying (quarter-finals)
 Hafiz Faizal / Gloria Emanuelle Widjaja (first round)
 Marcus Ellis / Lauren Smith (semi-finals)
 Goh Soon Huat / Shevon Jemie Lai (quarter-finals)
 Tan Kian Meng / Lai Pei Jing (semi-finals) 
 Thom Gicquel / Delphine Delrue (champions)
 Mark Lamsfuß / Isabel Herttrich (quarter-finals)
 Robin Tabeling / Selena Piek (first round)

Wild card 
Swiss Badminton awarded a wildcard entry to Yann Orteu / Aline Müller of Switzerland.

Finals

Top half

Section 1

Section 2

Bottom half

Section 3

Section 4

References

External links 
 Tournament Link

Swiss Open (badminton)
Swiss Open
Swiss Open
Swiss Open (badminton)